The 1918 Giro di Lombardia was the 14th edition of the Giro di Lombardia cycle race and was held on 10 November 1918. The race started in Milan and finished in Sesto San Giovanni. The race was won by Gaetano Belloni of the Bianchi team.

General classification

References

1918
Giro di Lombardia
Giro di Lombardia